Sabeen Rezvi (born 10 December 1984) is a Pakistani former cricketer who played as a right-arm off break bowler. She appeared in six One Day Internationals for Pakistan in 2002, all against Sri Lanka in 2002.

References

External links
 
 

1984 births
Living people
Cricketers from Karachi
Pakistani women cricketers
Pakistan women One Day International cricketers